The general government sector  includes all institutional units whose output is intended for individual and collective consumption and mainly financed by compulsory payments made by units belonging to other sectors, and/or all institutional units principally engaged in the redistribution of national income and wealth. The General government sector is subdivided into four subsectors: central government, state government, local government, and social security funds.

References

Official statistics